Hani Labib Mahmoud (born 25 August 1907, date of death unknown) was an Egyptian football forward who played for Egypt in the 1934 FIFA World Cup. He also played for Al-Ahly S.C.

International career
He represented Egypt in the 1934 FIFA World Cup and 1936 Summer Olympics.

References

External links

Egyptian footballers
Egypt international footballers
Association football forwards
Al Ahly SC players
1934 FIFA World Cup players
Olympic footballers of Egypt
Footballers at the 1936 Summer Olympics
1907 births
Year of death missing